Rudolf Daniel Ludwig Cronau (21 January 1855 – 27 October 1939) was a German-American painter, illustrator and journalist

Rudolf Cronau was well known in Germany for his illustrations, articles and books about the American West.

Early life
Rudolf Daniel Ludwig Cronau was born in Solingen, North Rhine-Westphalia, Prussia (Germany) on 21 January 1855, the only son of Rudolf Cronau, tax official by Helene Wilhelmine, née Waldeck. He attended between 1866 and 1869 the public school (höhere Bürgerschule) at Solingen. In 1870 Cronau was accepted into the Royal Academy of Art in Düsseldorf receiving formal art training, among others from renowned Andreas Achenbach. For a time he maintained an art studio at Düsseldorf. In 1877 he relocated to Leipzig and began working for Die Gartenlaube, an illustrated magazine. Cronau landed the job as their correspondent to the United States and sailed on the vessel "Oder" from Bremen, Germany reaching New York City on 17 January 1881 
.

Career 

Cronau contributed a series of articles and illustrations on the subject of life in the United States. In the fall of 1881 he journeyed to Fort Randall in Dakota Territory where he would meet and befriend Sitting Bull, then a prisoner of war at that post. Cronau was sympathetic to the Indian's plight, causing him to remain nearly half a year in the territory documenting and illustrating the Sioux. 
Most of Rudolf Cronau's artistic work from that period is in pencil, some in pen, and there are a few watercolors. Some of his drawings were transferred into collotypes, a photo printing process using gelatin. After Cronau returned to Germany in 1883, he published 50 collotypes in a book about his American visit entitled "Von Wunderland zu Wunderland".

Family and later life 
Rudolf Cronau was married in Leipzig, Germany on 8 February 1888 to Margarethe Tänzler of Chemnitz. Their daughter Margarethe Hildegard was born at Leipzig on 8 February 1892. Two years later, in 1894 Cronau returned to the United States bringing his wife and daughter settling in Washington DC, where their second daughter, Elisabeth was born on 20 January 1896. By the turn of the century Cronau relocated to New York where he would reside the remainder of his life. His only son, Rudolph was born in New York on 6 March 1900. Rudolf Cronau became a naturalized U.S. citizen on 21 December 1901. He died in Philipse Manor, New York on 27 October 1939,.

Publications (all in German) 
- Fahrten im Lande der Sioux (1886)

- Von Wunderland zu Wunderland (1886/87)

- Im Wilden Westen (1890)

- Amerika: Die Geschichte seiner Entdeckung (1892)

- Drei Jahrhunderte deutschen Lebens in Amerika (1909)

Publications in English 
 Our wasteful nation; the story of American prodigality and the abuse of our national resources 1908
 German achievements in America 1916
 Woman triumphant 1919

References

External links
 

1855 births
1939 deaths